Matthew Fontaine Maury (January 14, 1806February 1, 1873) was an American oceanographer and naval officer, serving the United States and then joining the Confederacy during the American Civil War.

He was nicknamed "Pathfinder of the Seas" and is considered a founder of modern oceanography. He wrote extensively on the subject, and his book, The Physical Geography of the Sea (1855), was the first comprehensive work on oceanography to be published.

In 1825, at 19, Maury obtained, through U.S. Representative Sam Houston, a midshipman's warrant in the United States Navy. As a midshipman on board the frigate , he almost immediately began to study the seas and record methods of navigation. When a leg injury left him unfit for sea duty, Maury devoted his time to studying navigation, meteorology, winds, and currents.

He became Superintendent of the United States Naval Observatory and head of the Depot of Charts and Instruments. There, Maury studied thousands of ships' logs and charts. He published the Wind and Current Chart of the North Atlantic, which showed sailors how to use the ocean's currents and winds to their advantage, drastically reducing the length of ocean voyages. Maury's uniform system of recording oceanographic data was adopted by navies and merchant marines worldwide and was used to develop charts for all the major trade routes.

With the outbreak of the American Civil War, Maury, a Virginian, resigned his commission as a U.S. Navy commander and joined the Confederacy. He spent the war in the Southern United States, and Great Britain and France as a Confederate envoy. He helped the Confederacy acquire a ship, while trying to convince several European powers to help stop the war. Following the war, Maury was eventually pardoned and accepted a teaching position at the Virginia Military Institute in Lexington, Virginia.

He died at the institute in 1873 after he had completed an exhausting state-to-state lecture tour on national and international weather forecasting on land. He had also completed his book, Geological Survey of Virginia, and a new series on geography for young people.

Early life and career
Maury was a descendant of the Maury family, a prominent Virginia family of Huguenot ancestry that can be traced back to 15th-century France. His grandfather (the Reverend James Maury) was an inspiring teacher to a future U.S. president, Thomas Jefferson. Maury also had Dutch-American ancestry from the "Minor" family of early Virginia.

He was born in 1806 in Spotsylvania County, Virginia, near Fredericksburg; his parents were Richard Maury and Diane Minor Maury. The family moved to Franklin, Tennessee, when he was five. He wanted to emulate the naval career of his older brother, Flag Lieutenant John Minor Maury, who, however, caught yellow fever after fighting pirates as an officer in the U.S. Navy. As a result of John's painful death, Matthew's father, Richard, forbade him from joining the Navy. Maury strongly considered attending West Point to get a better education than the Navy could offer. Instead, he obtained a naval appointment through the influence of Tennessee Representative Sam Houston, a family friend, in 1825, at the age of 19.

Maury joined the Navy as a midshipman on board the frigate  which was carrying the elderly the Marquis de La Fayette home to France, following the famous 1824 visit of the Marquis de Lafayette to the United States. Almost immediately, Maury began to study the seas and to record methods of navigation.

Scientific career
Maury's seagoing days ended abruptly at the age of 33 after a stagecoach accident broke his right leg. After that, he studied naval meteorology, navigation, and charting the winds and currents. He told his family that his work was inspired by Psalm 8, "Thou madest him to have dominion over the works of thy hands... and whatsoever passeth through the paths of the seas."

As officer-in-charge of the United States Navy office in Washington, DC, called the "Depot of Charts and Instruments," the young lieutenant became a librarian of the many unorganized log books and records in 1842. On his initiative, he sought to improve seamanship by organizing the information in his office and instituting a reporting system among the nation's shipmasters to gather further information on sea conditions and observations. The product of his work was international recognition and the publication in 1847 of Wind and Current Chart of the North Atlantic. His international recognition assisted in the change of purpose and name of the depot to the United States Naval Observatory and Hydrographical Office in 1854. He held that position until his resignation in April 1861. Maury was one of the principal advocates for founding a national observatory, and he appealed to a science enthusiast and former U.S. President, Representative John Quincy Adams, for the creation of what would eventually become the Naval Observatory. Maury occasionally hosted Adams, who enjoyed astronomy as an avocation, at the Naval Observatory. Concerned that Maury always had a long trek to and from his home on upper Pennsylvania Avenue, Adams introduced an appropriations bill that funded a Superintendent's House on the Observatory grounds. Adams thus felt no constraint in regularly stopping by for a look through the facility's telescope.

As a sailor, Maury noted numerous lessons that ship masters had learned about the effects of adverse winds and drift currents on the path of a ship. The captains recorded the lessons faithfully in their logbooks, which were then forgotten. At the Observatory, Maury uncovered an enormous collection of thousands of old ships' logs and charts in storage in trunks dating back to the start of the U.S. Navy. He pored over the documents to collect information on winds, calms, and currents for all seas in all seasons. His dream was to put that information in the hands of all captains.

Maury's work on ocean currents and investigations of the whaling industry led him to suspect that a warm-water, ice-free northern passage existed between the Atlantic and Pacific. He thought he detected a warm surface current pushing into the Arctic, and logs of old whaling ships indicated that whales killed in the Atlantic bore harpoons from ships in the Pacific (and vice versa). The frequency of these occurrences seemed unlikely if the whales had traveled around Cape Horn.

Lieutenant Maury published his Wind and Current Chart of the North Atlantic, which showed sailors how to use the ocean's currents and winds to their advantage and drastically reduce the length of voyages. His Sailing Directions and Physical Geography of the Seas and Its Meteorology remain standard. Maury's uniform system of recording synoptic oceanographic data was adopted by navies and merchant marines around the world and was used to develop charts for all the major trade routes.

Maury's Naval Observatory team included midshipmen assigned to him: James Melville Gilliss, Lieutenants John Mercer Brooke, William Lewis Herndon, Lardner Gibbon, Isaac Strain, John "Jack" Minor Maury II of the USN 1854 Darien Exploration Expedition, and others. Their duty was always temporary at the observatory, and new men had to be trained repeatedly. Thus Lt. Maury was simultaneously employed with astronomical and nautical work and constantly trained new temporary men to assist in these works. As his reputation grew, the competition among young midshipmen to be assigned to work with him intensified. He always had able, though constantly changing, assistants.

Maury advocated for naval reform, including a school for the Navy that would rival the Army's United States Military Academy. That reform was heavily pushed by Maury's many "Scraps from the Lucky Bag" and other articles printed in the newspapers, bringing about many changes in the Navy, including his finally fulfilled dream of the creation of the United States Naval Academy.

During its first 1848 meeting, he helped launch the American Association for the Advancement of Science (AAAS).

In 1849, Maury spoke out on the need for a transcontinental railroad to join the Eastern United States to California. He recommended a southerly route with Memphis, Tennessee, as the eastern terminus, as it is equidistant from Lake Michigan and the Gulf of Mexico. He argued that a southerly route running through Texas would avoid winter snows and could open up commerce with the northern states of Mexico. Maury also advocated construction of a railroad across the Isthmus of Panama.

For his scientific endeavors, Maury was elected to the American Philosophical Society in 1852.

International meteorological conference
Maury also called for an international sea and land weather service. Having charted the seas and currents, he worked on charting land weather forecasting. Congress refused to appropriate funds for a land system of weather observations.

Maury early became convinced that adequate scientific knowledge of the sea could be obtained only through international cooperation. He proposed that the United States invite the maritime nations of the world to a conference to establish a "universal system" of meteorology, and he was the leading spirit of a pioneer scientific conference when it met in Brussels in 1853. Within a few years, nations owning three-fourths of the shipping of the world were sending their oceanographic observations to Maury at the Naval Observatory, where the information was evaluated and the results were given worldwide distribution.

As its representative at the conference, the United States sent Maury. As a result of the Brussels Conference, many nations, including many traditional enemies, agreed to cooperate in sharing land and sea weather data using uniform standards. It was soon after the Brussels conference that Prussia, Spain, Sardinia, the Free City of Hamburg, the Republic of Bremen, Chile, Austria, Brazil, and others agreed to join the enterprise.

The Pope established honorary flags of distinction for the ships of the Papal States, which could be awarded only to the vessels that filled out and sent to Maury in Washington, DC, the Maury abstract logs.

Proposed deportation of slaves to Brazil 
Maury's stance on the institution of slavery has been termed "proslavery international". Maury, along with other politicians, newspaper editors, merchants, and United States government officials, envisioned a future for slavery that linked the United States, the Caribbean Sea, and the Amazon basin in Brazil. He believed the future of United States commerce lay in South America, colonized by white southerners and their enslaved people. There, Maury claimed, was "work to be done by Africans with the American axe in his hand." In the 1850s, he studied a way to send Virginia's slaves to Brazil as a way to phase out slavery in the state gradually. Maury was aware of an 1853 survey of the Amazon region conducted by the Navy by Lt. William Lewis Herndon. The 1853 expedition aimed to map the area for trade so American traders could go "with their goods and chattels [including enslaved people] to settle and to trade goods from South American countries along the river highways of the Amazon valley". Brazil maintained legal enslavement but had legally prohibited the importation of newly enslaved people from Africa in 1850 under the pressure of the British. Maury proposed that moving people enslaved in the United States to Brazil would reduce or eliminate slavery over time in as many areas of the southern United States as possible and would end new enslavement for Brazil. Maury's primary concern, however, was neither the freedom of enslaved people nor the amelioration of slavery in Brazil but rather an absolution for the white slaveholders of Virginia and other states of the southern United States. Maury wrote to his cousin, "Therefore I see in the slave territory of the Amazon the SAFETY VALVE of the Southern States."

Maury wanted to open up the Amazon to free navigation in his plan. However, Emperor Pedro II's government firmly rejected the proposals, and Maury's proposal received little to no support in the United States, especially in the enslaving southern states, which sought to perpetuate the institution and the riches made off the yoke of slavery. By 1855, the proposal had certainly failed. Brazil authorized free navigation to all nations in the Amazon in 1866, but only when it was at war against Paraguay when free navigation in the area had become necessary.

Maury was not an enslaver, but he did not actively oppose the institution of slavery. An article tying his legacy in oceanography to the slave trade suggested that Maury was ambivalent about slavery, seeing it as wrong but not intent on forcing others to free enslaved people. However, a recent article explaining the removal of his monument from Monument Avenue in Richmond, Virginia, illustrated a proslavery stance through deep ties to the slave trade that accompanied his scientific achievements.

American Civil War

Maury staunchly opposed secession, but in 1860, he wrote letters to the governors of New Jersey, Pennsylvania, Delaware, and Maryland urging them to stop the momentum toward war.  When Virginia declared secession in April 1861, Maury nonetheless resigned his commission in the U.S. Navy, choosing to fight against his country. With the outbreak of the American Civil War, Maury joined the Confederacy.

Upon his resignation from the U.S. Navy, the Virginia governor appointed Maury commander of the Virginia Navy. When this was consolidated into the Confederate Navy, Maury was made a Commander in the Confederate States Navy and appointed as chief of the Naval Bureau of Coast, Harbor, and River Defense. In this role, Maury helped develop the first electrically controlled naval mine, which caused havoc for U.S. shipping. He had experience with transatlantic cable and electricity flowing through wires underwater when working with Cyrus West Field and Samuel Finley Breese Morse. The naval mines, called torpedoes at that time, were similar to present-day contact mines and were said by the Secretary of the Navy in 1865 "to have cost the Union more vessels than all other causes combined."

Maury advocated for one because of the lack of a Confederate navy. Partly for this reason, partly because of his international reputation, and partly due to jealousy of superior officers who wanted him placed at some distance, in September 1862, he was ordered on special service to England. There, he sought to purchase and fit ships for the Confederacy and persuade European powers to recognize and support the Confederacy. Maury traveled to England, Ireland, and France, acquiring and fitting out ships for the Confederacy and soliciting supplies. Through speeches and newspaper publications, Maury unsuccessfully called for European nations to intercede on behalf of the Confederacy and help end the American Civil War. Maury established relations for the Confederacy with Emperor Napoleon III of France and Archduke Maximilian of Austria, who, on April 10, 1864, was proclaimed Emperor of Mexico.

At an early stage in the war, the Confederate States Congress assigned Maury and Francis H. Smith, a mathematics professor at the University of Virginia, to develop a system of weights and measures.

Later life
Maury was in the West Indies on his way back to the Confederacy when he learned of its collapse. The war had brought ruin to many in Fredericksburg, where Maury's immediate family lived. On the advice of Robert E. Lee and other friends, he decided not to return to Virginia but sent a letter of surrender to U.S. naval forces in the Gulf of Mexico and headed for Mexico. There Maximilian, whom he had met in Europe, appointed him "Imperial Commissioner of Colonization". Maury and Maximilian planned to entice former Confederates to immigrate to Mexico, building Carlotta and New Virginia Colony for displaced Confederates and immigrants from other lands. Upon learning of the plan, Lee wrote Maury saying, "The thought of abandoning the country, and all that must be left in it, is abhorrent to my feelings, and I prefer to struggle for its restoration, and share its fate, rather than to give up all as lost." In the end, the plan did not attract the intended immigrants and Maximilian, facing increasing opposition in Mexico, ended it. Maury then returned to England in 1866 and found work there.

In 1868 he was pardoned by the federal government and returned, accepting a teaching position at the Virginia Military Institute in Lexington, Virginia, holding the chair of physics. While in Lexington, he completed a physical survey of Virginia which he documented in the book The Physical Geography of Virginia. He had once been a gold mining superintendent outside Fredericksburg and had studied geology intensely during that time, so he was well-equipped to write such a book. He aimed to assist war-torn Virginia in rebuilding by discovering and extracting minerals, improving farming, etc. He lectured extensively in the United States and abroad. He advocated for creating a state agricultural college as an adjunct to Virginia Military Institute. This led to the establishment at Blacksburg of the Virginia Agricultural and Mechanical College, later renamed Virginia Polytechnic Institute and State University, in 1872. Maury was offered the position as its first president but turned it down because of his age.

He had previously been suggested as president of the College of William & Mary in Williamsburg, Virginia, in 1848 by Benjamin Blake Minor in his publication the Southern Literary Messenger. He considered becoming president of St. John's College in Annapolis, Maryland, the University of Alabama, and the University of Tennessee. It appears that he preferred being close to General Robert E. Lee in Lexington, where Lee was president of Washington College, from statements that he made in letters. Maury served as a pallbearer for Lee. He also gave talks in Europe about cooperation on a weather bureau for land, just as he had charted the winds and predicted storms at sea many years before. He gave speeches until his last days when he collapsed giving a speech. He went home after he recovered and told his wife Ann Hull Herndon-Maury, "I have come home to die."

Death and burial
He died at home in Lexington at 12:40 pm on Saturday, February 1, 1873. He was exhausted from traveling throughout the nation while he was giving speeches promoting land meteorology. His eldest son, Major Richard Launcelot Maury, and son-in-law, Major Spottswood Wellford Corbin, attended him. Maury asked his daughters and wife to leave the room. His last words to be recorded verbatim were "all's well," a nautical expression telling of calm conditions at sea.

His body was placed on display in the Virginia Military Institute library. Maury was initially buried in the Gilham family vault in Lexington's cemetery, across from Stonewall Jackson, until, after some delay into the following year, his remains were taken through Goshen Pass to Richmond, Virginia. He was reburied between Presidents James Monroe and John Tyler in Hollywood Cemetery in Richmond, Virginia.

Legacy

After decades of national and international work, Maury received fame and honors, including being knighted by several nations and given medals with precious gems as well as a collection of all medals struck by Pope Pius IX during his pontificate, a book dedication and more from Father Angelo Secchi, who was a student of Maury from 1848 to 1849 in the United States Naval Observatory. The two remained lifelong friends. Other religious friends of Maury included James Hervey Otey, his former teacher who, before 1857, worked with Bishop Leonidas Polk on the construction of the University of the South in Tennessee. While visiting there, Maury was convinced by his old teacher to give the "cornerstone speech."

As a U.S. Navy officer, he was required to decline awards from foreign nations. Some were offered to Maury's wife, Ann Hull Herndon-Maury, who accepted them for her husband. Some have been placed at Virginia Military Institute or lent to the Smithsonian. He became a commodore (often a title of courtesy) in the Virginia Provisional Navy and a Commander in the Confederacy.

 Buildings on several college campuses are named in his honor. Maury Hall was the home of the Naval Science Department at the University of Virginia and headquarters of the University's Navy ROTC battalion until being renamed in 2022. The original building of the College of William & Mary Virginia Institute of Marine Science is named Maury Hall as well. Another Maury Hall housed the Electrical and Computer Engineering Department and the Robotics and Control Engineering Department at the United States Naval Academy in Annapolis, Maryland. On February 17, 2023, the Academy announced that it had renamed this building in honor of Jimmy Carter, the only Naval Academy graduate to become President of the United States. The change had been recommended by a naming commission created by federal law to reexamine Confederate-related names and symbols on military installations. James Madison University also has a Maury Hall, the university's first academic and administrative building. In the wake of the 2020 George Floyd protests, JMU student organizations called for renaming the building. On Monday, June 22, 2020, hearing the calls of students and alums, the university president announced it would recommend to the JMU board of visitors to rename Maury Hall, along with Ashby Hall and Jackson Hall.

Ships have been named in his honor, including various vessels named ; USS Commodore Maury (SP-656), a patrol vessel and minesweeper of World War I; and a World War II Liberty Ship. Additionally, Tidewater Community College, based in Norfolk, Virginia, owns the R/V Matthew F. Maury. The ship is used for oceanography research and student cruises. In March 2013, the U.S. Navy launched the oceanographic survey ship USNS Maury (T-AGS-66).

The Mariners' Lake, in Newport News, Virginia, had been named after Maury but had its name changed during the George Floyd protests. The lake is located on the Mariners' Museum property and is encircled by a walking trail.

The Maury River, entirely in Rockbridge County, Virginia, near Virginia Military Institute (where Maury taught), also honors the scientist, as does Maury crater, on the Moon.

Matthew Fontaine Maury High School in Norfolk, Virginia, is named after him. Matthew Maury Elementary School in Alexandria, Virginia, was built in 1929. Nearby Arlington, Va., renamed its 1910 Clarendon Elementary to honor Maury in 1944; Since 1976, the building has been home to the Arlington Arts Center (rebranded in 2022 as the Museum of Contemporary Art Arlington). There is a county historical marker outside the former school. Matthew Fontaine Maury School in Fredericksburg was built in 1919-1920 and closed in 1980. The building was converted into condominiums and is on the National Register of Historic Places. Adjoining it is Maury Stadium, built in 1935 and still used for local high school sports events.

Numerous historical markers commemorate Maury throughout the South, including those in Richmond, Virginia, Fletcher, North Carolina, Franklin, Tennessee, and several in Chancellorsville, Virginia.

The Matthew Fontaine Maury Papers collection at the Library of Congress contains over 14,000 items. It documents Maury's extensive career and scientific endeavors, including correspondence, notebooks, lectures, and written speeches.

On July 2, 2020, the mayor of Richmond ordered the removal of a statue of Maury erected in 1929 on Richmond's Monument Avenue. The mayor used his emergency powers to bypass a state-mandated review process, calling the statue a "severe, immediate and growing threat to public safety."

Publications

On the Navigation of Cape Horn
Whaling Charts
Wind and Current Charts

Explanations and Sailing Directions to Accompany the Wind and Current Charts, 1851, 1854, 1855
Lieut. Maury's Investigations of the Winds and Currents of the Sea, 1851
On the Probable Relation between Magnetism and the Circulation of the Atmosphere, 1851
Maury's Wind and Current Charts: Gales in the Atlantic, 1857

Observations to Determine the Solar Parallax, 1856
Amazon, and the Atlantic Slopes of South America, 1853
Commander M. F. Maury on American Affairs, 1861
The Physical Geography of the Sea and Its Meteorology, 1861
Maury's New Elements of Geography for Primary and Intermediate Classes
Geography: "First Lessons"
Elementary Geography: Designed for Primary and Intermediate Classes
Geography: "The World We Live In"
Published Address of Com. M. F. Maury, before the Fair of the Agricultural & Mechanical Society
Geology: A Physical Survey of Virginia; Her Geographical Position, Its Commercial Advantages and National Importance, Virginia Military Institute, 1869

See also

Bathymetric chart
Flying Cloud
National Institute for the Promotion of Science
Notable global oceanographers
Prophet Without Honor

References

Further reading

External links

. 1996 website retrieved via the Wayback Search Engine
CBNnews VIDEO on Commander Matthew Fontaine Maury "The Father of Modern Oceanography"
Naval Oceanographic Office—Matthew Fontaine Maury Oceanographic Library  — The World's Largest Oceanographic Library.
United States Naval Sea Cadet Corps — Matthew Fontaine Maury — Pathfinders Division.
The Maury Project; A comprehensive national program of teacher enhancement based on studies of the physical foundations of oceanography.
The Mariner's Museum: Matthew Fontaine Maury Society.
Letter to President John Quincy Adams from Commander Matthew Fontaine Maury (1847) on the "National" United States Naval Observatory regarding a written description of the observatory, in detail, with other information relating thereto, including an explanation of the objects and uses of the various instruments.
The National (Naval) Observatory and The Virginia Historical Society (May 1849)
Biography of Matthew Fontaine Maury at U.S. Navy Historical Center.
The Diary of Betty Herndon Maury, daughter of Matthew Fontaine Maury, 1861–1863.
Matthew Fontaine Maury School in Richmond, Virginia, USA, 1950s. Photographer: Nina Leen. Approximately 200 TIME-LIFE photographs
Astronomical Observations from the Naval Observatory 1845.
Obituary in: 
Sample charts by Maury held the American Geographical Society Library, UW Milwaukee in the digital map collection.

 
1806 births
1873 deaths
19th-century American people
American astronomers
American earth scientists
American educators
American geographers
American oceanographers
American people of Dutch descent
American people of French descent
American Protestants
American science writers
Microscopists
People from Spotsylvania County, Virginia
People of Virginia in the American Civil War
Science and technology in the United States
United States Navy officers
Writers from Virginia
Hall of Fame for Great Americans inductees
Maury family of Virginia
People from Franklin, Tennessee
United States Navy